Campton is an unincorporated community in Spartanburg County, in the U.S. state of South Carolina.

History
A post office called Campton was established in 1875, and remained in operation until 1902. The community was named for Squire "Billy" Camp, an early settler.

References

Unincorporated communities in Spartanburg County, South Carolina
Unincorporated communities in South Carolina